The 2020 Connacht Senior Football Championship was the 121st instalment of the annual Connacht Senior Football Championship organised by Connacht GAA. It is one of the four provincial competitions of the 2020 All-Ireland Senior Football Championship. The winning team (Mayo) received the J. J. Nestor Cup, named after J. J. Nestor of Quinaltagh, County Galway.

The draw for the Connacht Championship was made on 8 October 2019.

On 17 March, the GAA confirmed that the opening fixture – due to have taken place at Gaelic Park in The Bronx on 3 May – had been postponed due to the impact of the COVID-19 pandemic on Gaelic games.

Due to the COVID-19 pandemic, London, New York and Sligo did not compete in the championship. As a result, Galway advanced to the provincial final without playing a single match. Sligo returned for the 2021 championship. London and New York returned for the 2022 championship.

Teams
The Connacht championship is contested by the five counties in the Irish province of Connacht plus London and New York.

Due to Covid-19 withdrew teams: + = Back in 2021, * = Back in 2022.

Bracket

Quarter-finals

Summary

Matches

Semi-finals

Summary

Matches

Final

See also
 2020 All-Ireland Senior Football Championship
 2020 Leinster Senior Football Championship
 2020 Munster Senior Football Championship
 2020 Ulster Senior Football Championship
 Impact of the COVID-19 pandemic on Gaelic games

References

External links
 Connacht GAA website

2C
Connacht Senior Football Championship
Connacht Championship